The Jamestown Academy in Jamestown, New York, United States, was a school built in 1810. It was also called the "Old Academy". One of the founders was Abner Hazeltine. It was located on the southeast corner of Fourth and Spring Streets. "The Academy was moved several times." It was torn down in 1910.

Notable alumni
 Lorin Blodget (1823–1901)
 Chapin Hall (1816–1879)
 George Stoneman Jr. (1822–1894)
 Davis Hanson Waite (1825–1901)
 John Barber White (1847–1923), lumber businessman and member of the Pennsylvania House of Representatives
 Hugo Zacchini (1898–1975)

References 

Jamestown, New York
Schools in Chautauqua County, New York
1837 establishments in New York (state)
1910 disestablishments in New York (state)
Buildings and structures demolished in 1910
Demolished buildings and structures in New York (state)